The following is a list of bridges over the River Lagan in Northern Ireland listed going upstream from Belfast Lough.

References

Lists of river crossings